Zlatibor may refer to:

Places
 Zlatibor, a mountain region in Serbia
 Zlatibor District, a district in Serbia
 Zlatibor (town), a town in Serbia, in the Čajetina Municipality
 , a lake in town Zlatibor, Serbia

Sports
 FK Zlatibor, based in Užice
 FK Zlatibor, based in Čajetina
 KK Zlatibor, based in Čajetina